Mateus Dias Lima (born 23 April 2004), known as Mateus Lima or Mateusão, is a Brazilian professional footballer who plays as a forward for Campeonato Brasileiro Série A club Flamengo.

Career

Early Career
Born in Três Marias, Minas Gerais, Mateusão began his career with América Mineiro before being transferred to CR Flamengo on 29 April 2019.

Flamengo
On 3 June 2020, he signed his first professional contract with the latter club, until April 2025.

Mateusão made his professional debut for Flamengo on 2 March 2021, coming on as a 76th-minute substitute for Yuri de Oliveira in a 1–0 Campeonato Carioca home win over Nova Iguaçu. On 19 August of the following year, he renewed his contract until 2027.

Career statistics

Honours
Flamengo
Copa Libertadores: 2022
Copa do Brasil: 2022

References

2004 births
Living people
People from Minas Gerais
Brazilian footballers
Association football forwards
Campeonato Brasileiro Série A players
CR Flamengo footballers
Brazil youth international footballers